Naseri may refer to:

 Naceri, surname in Persian and Arabic languages
 Nâseri, name given to the old town of Ahwaz
 Naseri, Bushehr, a village in Bushehr Province, Iran
 Naseri, Kerman, a village in Kerman Province, Iran
 Naseri, Khuzestan, a village in Khuzestan Province, Iran
 Naseri, Kohgiluyeh and Boyer-Ahmad, a village in Kohgiluyeh and Boyer-Ahmad Province, Iran
 Naseri, Qazvin, a village in Qazvin Province, Iran
 Naseri Rural District, in Khuzestan Province, Iran